Jeongan or Ding'an (938–986) was a successor state of Balhae (Bohai) founded by Yeol Man-hwa (Lie Wanhua).

Establishment and Downfall 
The early history of Jeongan is mostly unknown. Large number of rebels emerged on the former Balhae territories after the kingdom's conquest by the Liao dynasty in 926, although most were quickly defeated by Liao forces. General Yeol Manhwa (Lie Wanhua) established Jeongan in the mid-930s, at a time when the Liao puppet state of Dongdan was abolished and the main Liao forces left the region. Jeongan is recorded to have enlisted the assistance of neighboring tribes with the hopes of overthrowing the Liao dynasty, but apparently failed to do so. 

In 970, the king paid tribute to the Song dynasty together with the neighboring Jurchens. The official Chinese historical record, the History of Song claimed that Jeongan people's origin can be traced back to the former confederacy of Mahan. However, the Mahan confederacy in the distant south of the Korean peninsula had disappeared for almost a millennium by the 10th century, and many scholars consider this record, written in the Yuan dynasty, to be an error. Oh Hyeon-myeong himself, on the other hand, stated that his people were Balhae remnants that lived the former land of Goguryeo. The purpose of Jeongan's tributary mission was a proposal that the Song and Jeongan ally and initiate a joint attack against the Liao, which the Song declined due to the Liao's military prowess. 

In 975, the Liao Dynasty once again invaded Jeongan, which failed. In 976, the Yeol clan was replaced by the Oh clan, and Jeongan was ruled by Oh Hyeon-myeong (Wu Xuanming) until before it was finally destroyed by the Liao dynasty in 986 CE. Korean historians theorize that the Oh Clan's replacement of the Yeol Clan may have been violent and could have played a role in the destruction of Jeongan. According to the Goryeosa, tens of thousands of Balhae refugees fled to Goryeo in 979, and was recorded as the largest Balhae migration since the 936 exodus when Balhae Crown Prince Dae Gwang-hyeon had similarly led tens of thousands of refugees into Goryeo.

Although Jeongan officially fell in 986, records indicate that Balhae resistance against the Liao continued despite the fall of the state and the Liao had to establish three military outposts in the lower Yalu River when they formally annexed Jeongan in 991. The last remnants of Balhae resistance from the former state of Jeongan were destroyed by 999.

Rulers 
Yeol Man-hwa/Lie Wanhua (烈萬華, 열만화, 938–976)
Oh Hyeon-myeong/Wu Xuanming (烏玄明, 오현명, 976–986)

See also
Balhae
Later Balhae
Heungyo

References

Balhae
938 establishments
History of Manchuria
Former countries in Chinese history
Former countries in Korean history
986 disestablishments